Kazimov, Kazimova for females, is a surname and it may refer to:

Aygün Kazımova (born 1971), Azerbaijani singer
Dilara Kazimova (born 1984), Azerbaijani singer
Narmin Kazimova (born 1993), Azerbaijani chess player
Salahaddin Kazimov, Internal Troops major general 

Azerbaijani-language surnames